The 1969 Sam Houston State Bearkats football team represented Sam Houston State College (now known as Sam Houston State University) as a member of the Lone Star Conference (LSC) during the 1969 NAIA football season. Led by second-year head coach Tom Page, the Bearkats compiled an overall record of 3–6–1 with a mark of 2–4–1 in conference play, and finished sixth in the LSC.

Schedule

References

Sam Houston State
Sam Houston Bearkats football seasons
Sam Houston State Bearkats football